The Report of the Committee on the Working of the Monetary System (commonly known as The Radcliffe Report) is a report published in 1959 about monetary policy and the workings of the Bank of England. It is named after its chairman, Cyril Radcliffe, 1st Viscount Radcliffe. The report started collecting evidence in 1957 and was the result of dissatisfaction with the workings of monetary policy in the 1950s. It still today remains an important reference document on the Bank of England.

Context of creation 
Monetary theory made progress after the interwar years but was disrupted by the war. After the second world war, the context was adequate to start rethinking how to run monetary policy and this is when the Radcliffe Committee was set up. The committee was composed of Lord Radcliffe, Professor Cairncross, Sir Oliver Franks, Viscount Harcourt, W. E. Jones, Professor Sayers, Sir Reginald Verdon Smith, George Woodcock and Sir John Woods.

Contents 
The 339-pages report reviews British monetary policy since 1931 to give recommendations. The report downplays the importance of keeping money supply within strict limits as well the importance of monetary policy. The report generally was a way to get more control over the Bank of England, suggesting for example to let the Chancellor of the Exchequer to announce changes in Bank rate instead of the Bank of England.

Aftermath and impact 
The clear impact of the report on monetary policy is debated and its actual influence on policy is limited. Economist  Anna Schwartz, 10 years after the publication of the report, wrote that research in the following years gave "no support to the views expressed in the Radcliffe Report".

One of the main recommendations was that if the commercial banks nor Trustee Savings Bank introduced a Giro system for mass banking, the General Post Office should investigate introducing it. In 1965 when the new Labour Government published a white paper "A Post Office Giro", outlining such a system with a computerised central system for processing transactions. Subsequently National Girobank was created in 1968.

References 

Monetary economics